The Dying of a Last Breed is the eleventh stand-up comedy album by American comedian Doug Stanhope. It was filmed and recorded live at the Plaza Hotel in Las Vegas, and became available on May 19, 2020, through Vimeo.

Track listing
(adapted from Apple Music)

References

External links 
Doug Stanhope's official website

2020 films
2020 live albums
2020 comedy films
Doug Stanhope albums
Live spoken word albums
Stand-up comedy concert films